Surat Narkchumsang (born 30 December 1980), also spelled Nakchumsang, is a professional footballer from Thailand who plays for Fleet in Thai League 3 as a goalkeeper.

References

External links
 
 

1980 births
Living people
Surat Narkchumsang
Association football goalkeepers
Surat Narkchumsang
Surat Narkchumsang
Surat Narkchumsang